Jo Angel (born 22 April 1968) is an Australian former cricketer who played in four Test matches and three One Day Internationals between 1993 and 1995.

Biography
Born in Mount Lawley, Western Australia, Angel made his Test debut against the West Indies at the WACA Ground in 1993, forcing Desmond Haynes to retire hurt after hitting him in the face with a short ball.

He toured Sri Lanka in 1994 for the Singer Cup one-day tournament with some degree of success as the other Australian pacemen struggled in the heat and slow conditions. However he did not make a consistent impact and was dropped shortly after.

While his international career did not take off, Angel helped carry the Western Australian attack and holds the career wickets record for Western Australia. On 28 July 2000 he was awarded the Australian Sports Medal for being "fourth on list of all time greatest wicket takers for Western Australia" and is the only bowler to have taken 400 or more wickets for the state in the Sheffield Shield with 419 wickets. He also took a further 26 wickets in other First-class matches for Western Australia, bringing his total to 445.

References

External links

1968 births
Living people
Australia One Day International cricketers
Australia Test cricketers
Western Australia cricketers
Gloucestershire cricketers
Australian cricketers
Recipients of the Australian Sports Medal
Cricketers from Perth, Western Australia
Sportsmen from Western Australia